Stay the Same is Joey McIntyre's first solo album, released on March 16, 1999, by Columbia Records and C2 Records. It includes his first single, the title track, "Stay the Same".

Release and reception
The album was released during the late 1990s' teen pop revival, which was mostly dominated by artists like Britney Spears, Christina Aguilera, Backstreet Boys and 'N Sync. The album was able to gain substantial success due to the placement of the single "Stay the Same", which peaked at #10 on the Billboard Hot 100. Fellow New Kids On The Block bandmate Jordan Knight released an album in the same year, with his single "Give It to You" peaking at #10 on the Billboard Hot 100 as well. The album peaked at #49 on the Billboard 200 and was certified Gold by the RIAA.

The second single released, "I Love You Came Too Late", peaked at #53 on the Billboard Hot 100.

Promotion
McIntyre toured with the pop artist Britney Spears in the Disneyland Tour series to promote their albums.

Track listing
"Couldn't Stay Away from Your Love" (Joey McIntyre; Joseph Carrier) - 4:43
"I Can't Do It Without You" (Joey McIntyre; Joseph Carrier) - 3:50
"Give It Up" (Donnie Wahlberg; Emmanuel LeBlanc; Herb Lane; Joey McIntyre; Keith Crier; Larry Thomas; Paul Service) - 4:27
"Stay the Same" (Joey McIntyre; Joseph Carrier) - 3:48
"I Love You Came Too Late" (Eric Foster White; Mikey Bassie) - 3:14
"All I Wanna Do" (Joey McIntyre; Joseph Carrier) - 4:40
"The Way That I Loved You" (Joey McIntyre; Joseph Carrier) - 4:09
"I Cried" (Joey McIntyre) - 4:39
"Because Of You" (Donnie Wahlberg; Joey McIntyre; Larry Thomas; Raphael Saadiq) - 5:09                                                 
"We Can Get Down" (D. Farrier; Donnie Wahlberg; Joey Mcintyre; L. Thomas) - 3:58
"Let Me Take You for A Ride" (Brad Young; Danny Wood; Dow Brain; Joey McIntyre) - 3:44
"One Night" (Brad Young; Danny Wood; Dow Brain; Joey McIntyre) - 4:01
"Without Your Love" (Joey McIntyre; Vince Evans) - 6:24

Singles
 "Stay the Same" - February 9, 1999
 "I Love You Came Too Late" - August 17, 1999
 "I Cried" - December 1999

Charts

Certifications

References

1999 debut albums
Joey McIntyre albums